Kelapanda Chengappa Ganapathy (born 18 November 1995) is an Indian professional sailor. He currently represents India internationally in the 49er event.

In 2018 Asian Games in Jakarta, The duo KC Ganapathy and Varun Thakkar first tasted major success when they won bronze in sailing.

Career
K.C. Ganapathy made his international debut in 2010 at the Asian Sailing Championship, where he finished 8th in the Optimist event. In 2021, K.C. Ganapathy and Varun Thakkar secured the 1st Rank in the 49er Class  (event)  2021 Mussanah Open Championship at Millenium Resort, Mussanah in Oman and he also Won Bronze Medal in 2018 Asian Games at Jakarta, Indonesia.

2020 Summer Olympics
K.C. Ganapathy qualified for his debut Olympics Games 2020 in sailing after finishing 1st position in the 2021 Mussanah Open (Asia and Africa Olympic Qualifier) Tournament at Mussanah in Oman and now he will represent India Team at the Skiff – 49er Event  in Sailing at the 2020 Summer Olympics of the 2020 Summer Olympics in Tokyo, Japan.

Tournaments record

References

External links
 
 
 

1995 births
Living people
Indian male sailors (sport)
Asian Games medalists in sailing
Asian Games bronze medalists for India
Sailors at the 2010 Asian Games
Sailors at the 2018 Asian Games
Medalists at the 2018 Asian Games
Olympic sailors of India
Sailors at the 2020 Summer Olympics – 49er
Sportspeople from Tamil Nadu
Sportspeople from Karnataka
Place of birth missing (living people)